William Gleeson may refer to:
William Gleeson (hurler, fl. 1880s), Irish hurler for Cork
William Gleeson (priest) (1827–1903),  Roman Catholic priest, missionary, linguist, and historian
Willie Gleeson (William Joseph Gleeson, 1893–1975), Irish hurler for Limerick
Bill Gleeson (William Joseph Gleeson, 1931–1998), Australian rules footballer

See also
William Gleason (disambiguation)